James Allen Boyle (born August 19, 1958) is an American businessperson and politician from Maine. Boyle served as a Democratic State Senator from Maine's 6th District, representing Scarborough, Westbrook and his residence of Gorham from 2012 to 2014. Boyle was a candidate in the January 2022 special election for Maine House District 27, which he won. He ran for Governor of Maine in the 2018 election but dropped out before the Democratic primary. He owns Boyle Associates Environmental Consultants and Avant Dance & Event Center.

Boyle, who ran as a privately funded candidate, defeated State Representative Tim Driscoll in the Democratic Primary for the District 6 Senate seat. The seat had been held by Phil Bartlett, who was unable to run for re-election due to term limits. In the general election, he beat Ruth Summers, wife of Maine Secretary of State Charlie Summers.

In 2014, Representative Amy Volk (R-Scarborough) defeated Boyle by a margin of approximately 900 votes in the November 2014 general election. The Volk-Boyle race was one of the state's most watched contests. Over $330,000 was spent by outside groups in the race. Boyle lost despite approximately two-thirds of the outside spending seeking to benefit Boyle.

He earned a B.S. in forest management from the University of Maine in 1981.

References

1958 births
Living people
Politicians from Gorham, Maine
University of Maine alumni
Businesspeople from Maine
Democratic Party Maine state senators